Galam may refer to:
 Galam Cennalath, king of the Picts
 Galam, Iran, a village in Razavi Khorasan Province, Iran